Frédéric Henri Godefroid Émile Constantin (Fritz) ridder Mayer van den Bergh (22 April 1858 - 4 May 1901) was a Belgian art collector and art historian.

Life
Born in Antwerp, he was the eldest son of spice and drug trader Emil Mayer and his wife Henriëtte Isabelle Joanna (1838-1920). Wealthy like her husband (she was bequeathed five castles over the course of her life), Henriëtte was an art collector and daughter to the gin distiller Jean-Felix van den Bergh, who lived in kasteel Maxburg in Meer.

Frederik inherited millions of francs on his father's death, investing it in art, including many old master paintings and built up a renowned knowledge of art history, particularly Pieter Bruegel the Elder and Cornelis de Vos, owning five works by the latter artist. He was promoted to the Belgian hereditary nobility in 1888, with the inheritable title of "ridder" (knight), but he died unmarried from a riding accident in Antwerp aged only 43. 

His art collection was preserved but not completed as he had wished. He left it to his mother, who fulfilled his wishes and founded the Museum Mayer van den Bergh. His younger brother Oscar Jean Joseph Henri Émile Clément (Oscar) Mayer van den Bergh (22 March 1859, Antwerp - 8 August 1913, Edegem) published two catalogues of Fritz's collection - Oscar had married jkvr. Romaine du Bois d'Aische (1860-1944) in Edegem in 1887 and had two daughters with her, rising to the hereditary nobility himself in 1888.

A street was named Fredericusstraat after him in Mortsel in 1930, whilst "Van den Bergh" was posthumously added to his family name in 1933. The Mayerhof care centre succeeds the Sint-Frederikinstituut on the same site, the latter founded by Henriëtte in 1904.

Bibliography
  Collections du Chevalier Mayer van den Bergh. Catalogue des tableaux exposées dans les galeries de la Maison des Rois Mages. Anvers, 1904.
  Oscar Mayer van den Bergh, Collections du chevalier Mayer van den Bergh. Catalogue des jetons, médailles, méreaux et monnaies exposés dans les galeries de la Maison des Rois Mages, à Anvers. Anvers, [1911].
  Oscar Mayer van den Bergh, Collections du chevalier Mayer van den Bergh. Catalogue des volumes formant la Bibliothèque de la Maison des Rois Mages, Rue de l'Hôpital, 19, Anvers. [Z.p.], 1920.
  Jozef De Coo, Fritz Mayer van den Bergh: De verzamelaar, de verzameling. Schoten, C. Govaerts, 1979.
  H. NIEUWDORP & I. KOEKELBERGH, Het Museum Mayer van de Bergh, Collectie Musea Nostra, Brussel, 1992.
  Oscar COOMANS DE BRACHÈNE, État présent de la noblesse belge, Annuaire 1993, Brusse, 1993.

References

Belgian knights
People from Antwerp
1858 births
1901 deaths
Art collectors from Antwerp
Belgian art historians
Scholars of Dutch art
Scholars of Netherlandish art